Heyonuvaane is a 2010 drama film directed by Yoosuf Shafeeu. Written and produced by Fathimath Nahula under Crystal Entertainment, the film stars Yoosuf Shafeeu, Fathimath Fareela and Sheela Najeeb in pivotal roles. The film was released on 28 December 2010.

Cast 
 Yoosuf Shafeeu as Ziya
 Fathimath Fareela as Rizna Zareer
 Sheela Najeeb as Muna
 Maani as Maani
 Lufshan Shakeeb as Nasheed
 Mohamed Faisal  as Dr. Latheef
 Koyya Hassan Manik as Hamid
 Fauziyya Hassan as Muna's mother
 Aminath Rasheedha as Ziyad's mother

Soundtrack

Release and response
Upon release, the film received mixed reviews from critics. Ahmed Naif from Sun displeased with its predictable storyline wrote: "The use of flashbacks and character introduction was lame. Neither the order of scenes nor its transactions are worth being mentioned. The only good thing about this movie is Sheela Najeeb's performance; which is clearly the best I have witnessed during the year from a heroine. Other reviewers in favor of its music, cinematography and Sheela's performance while the "weak plot" and storyline were criticised. Twenty two housefull shows of the film were screened at cinema, making it the second highest-grossing Maldivian release of the year.

Accolades

References

External links 
 

2010 films
Maldivian drama films
Films directed by Yoosuf Shafeeu
2010 drama films
Dhivehi-language films